Indego is a public bicycle sharing system that serves parts of Philadelphia. Operations started on April 23, 2015, with 125 stations and 1000 bikes. The system is operated by Bicycle Transit Systems, a Philadelphia-based company, with bikes provided by B-cycle and stations as well as bicycles owned by the City of Philadelphia.

History 
In June 2008, Philadelphia City Council voted a resolution “requesting the Administration and the Deputy Mayor of Transportation and Utilities to commission a study to provide recommendations on location, demand, and usage for Public 
Use Bicycle stations for the entire area encompassed by the city limits of Philadelphia and to explore the various business models used for such systems”'.

On February 25, 2010, the feasibility study voted by the city council was released. The study suggested “a first phase deployment of 1,750 bikes” in the central districts of the city.

In December 2012, the City Council voted a $3 millions contribution to start the program, on the request of Philadelphia mayor, Michael Nutter.

A strategic business plan was released by the city of Philadelphia in August 2013, prepared by Toole Design Group, LLC and Foursquare ITP.

After a request for proposal issued in October 2013, Philadelphia announced on April 24, 2014 that Bicycle Transit System has been selected to plan and operate the system, while B-cycle will provide the bikes, the stations and the technology platform. Launch is planned for Spring 2015, with 60 stations and 600 bikes.

In Fall 2014, the city of Philadelphia surveyed residents for best station locations, receiving 10,500 public comments.

On February 11, 2015 the city announced the system would be launched on April 23, with Independence Blue Cross being the main sponsor.

In April 2016, Indego announced 24 new stations and added 300 bicycles to the fleet.  Indego also implemented a reduced payment plan for low income residents.

In November 2018, Indego deposited 10 e-bikes at various stations around the city. In May 2019, the company evaluated test run as successful and announced plans to add 400 more electric bikes along with 12 new stations.

Pricing 

Indego offers three plans:
 Indego30, a 30-day membership for $20. It allows unlimited trips up to one hour (the user is charged 20 cents per minute after the first hour of each rental.) This plan can be paid with credit card online. A discounted membership for low income residents with ACCESS cards is available for $5 per month.
 Indego365, an annual membership for $156, the equivalent of $13/month.
 Guest Pass, a 24-hour pass for $15. It allows unlimited trips up to one hour (the user is charged 20 cents per minute after the first hour of each rental.)
 Indego Corporate Pass Program through jawnt

See also 
Bicycle Coalition of Greater Philadelphia
List of bicycle sharing systems

References

External links 
Indego

Community bicycle programs
Transportation in Philadelphia
Cycling in Pennsylvania
Bicycle sharing in the United States